Francesco Monaco may refer to:

Francesco Monaco (died 1626), Italian Roman Catholic bishop
Francesco Monaco (born 1898), Italian Roman Catholic bishop
Francesco Monaco (footballer), Italian footballer